The Da Vinci Code is a novel by Dan Brown published in 2003.

The Da Vinci Code may also refer to:

 The Da Vinci Code (film), the 2006 film based on the novel
 The Da Vinci Code (soundtrack), a CD based on the music of the film
 The Da Vinci Code (video game), the 2006 game based on the novel, and timed for release with the movie
 The Da Vinci Code (play), a 2022 stage adaption based on the novel

See also

Da Vinci (disambiguation)